Skool Daze is a computer game released by Microsphere in 1984 for the ZX Spectrum and Commodore 64 home computers. It was written by David Reidy, with graphics designed by Keith Warrington. The game was commercially and critically successful, and praised for its original concept. It has since been regarded as one of the pioneers of the sandbox game genre.

Gameplay 
The game features the player as a schoolboy named Eric, with the objective of stealing his report card out of the staff room safe by accomplishing various tasks around the school.  The computer controls all the other characters in the game, including the headmaster, other teachers and other pupils.

The four teachers are Mr Wacker (the headmaster), Mr Rockitt (the science teacher), Mr Withit (the geography teacher) and Mr Creak (the history master). Other than Eric, three of the pupils are named: Boy Wander (the tearaway), Angelface (the bully) and Einstein (the swot).  The player has the option of renaming the characters before the game begins. There are also many unnamed, undistinguished pupils at the school.

If Eric is caught out of class or otherwise misbehaving, teacher characters pursue him and issue lines. When 10,000 lines or more are accumulated, the game ends with Eric's expulsion.  However, Eric can also receive lines for things that are not his fault, such as lying or sitting on the floor when in fact he has been knocked down, or being nearest a teacher who has just been hit by a projectile fired by one of the other pupils.  So part of the challenge of the game is to prevent other pupils from getting Eric into trouble.

Background
Helen Reidy had a background in teaching, while David had fonder memories of activities between lessons and designed the game around this. The characters were based on schoolboy characters he read about as a child, including Just William and The Beano's The Bash Street Kids. He later clarified that "each of the rooms would look like a frame in a comic".

David Reidy considered himself to be more proficient as a programmer and engineer, and decided the game's graphics would benefit from a separate designer. He recruited a family friend, Keith Warrington, who was studying graphic design. Warrington learned the rudiments of computer graphics from David, and drew the characters as line drawings on squared paper. From this, he blocked in the individual pixels to create an appropriate sprite, with tracing paper to design the individual animation frames for each character. He later obtained a Spectrum to assist with the design, but found using graph paper easier. Warrington based the teachers on ones that had taught him at school, and later said the geography teacher, Mr Withit, was based on "my all time favourite teacher". He found the screen resolution limitations helpful, as it forced him to design cartoon-like characters, saying "You couldn’t do a normal person because they would have all looked the same". As with other Microsphere games, David designed the program on paper, which Helen typed into the computer.

Self promotion 
The character of Boy Wander would write on blackboards about Microsphere games like Wheelie and Sky Ranger. In Back to Skool, Boy Wander writes about Contact Sam Cruise.

Reception

Skool Daze was a commercial success when first released, selling 50,000 copies despite very little marketing or promotion. Reidy later realised he could have made more money with an appropriate campaign, and regretted the loss of income due to software piracy, but was still happy that the game was profitable and covered costs.

The ZX Spectrum version was voted the 4th best game of all time in a special issue of Your Sinclair magazine in 2004.

Zzap!64 reviewed the Commodore 64 version which they found to be graphically and sonically weak, but enjoyable to play due to the innovative gameplay.  It was given an overall rating of 78%.

The game has been recognised as being a pioneer of the sandbox game format, later used by Little Computer People and The Sims.

Sequels and conversions 
The game was followed by Back to Skool, which expanded the gameplay to include a neighbouring girls' school and a love interest (with the benefit of being able to reduce one's lines), along with stink bombs, mice, water pistols, frogs, sherry and a long-suffering caretaker. An unofficial remake is Klass of '99, a PC edition of Skool Daze with updated graphics and various changes to the gameplay.  Unofficial conversions of Skool Daze have been made on the Atari 8-bit family, Oric and Amstrad CPC computers.

References

External links
 

 Skool Daze at Flatbatteries
 A walkthrough video of Skool Daze on the ZX Spectrum

1984 video games
ZX Spectrum games
Commodore 64 games
Action-adventure games
School-themed video games
Single-player video games
Video games developed in the United Kingdom